The Tŏngnam Line is an electrified railway line of the Korean State Railway in Tŏkch'ŏn-si, South P'yŏngan Province, North Korea, running from South Tŏkch'ŏn on the P'yŏngdŏk Line to Tŏngnam.

Route

References

Railway lines in North Korea
Standard gauge railways in North Korea